France competed at the 1952 Winter Olympics in Oslo, Norway.

Medalists

Alpine skiing

Men

Women

Bobsleigh

Cross-country skiing

Men

Men's 4 × 10 km relay

Women

Figure skating

Men

Women

Ski jumping

References

 Olympic Winter Games 1952, full results by sports-reference.com

Nations at the 1952 Winter Olympics
1952
Olympics